St. Paul Aerodrome  is located  west of St. Paul, Alberta, Canada.

References

External links

Place to Fly on COPA's Places to Fly airport directory

Registered aerodromes in Alberta
County of St. Paul No. 19